Tom Rethman is an American football coach and former player.  He served as the head football coach at Briar Cliff University from 2008 to 2016, compiling a record of 21–78.

Head coaching record

References

Year of birth missing (living people)
Living people
American football defensive backs
Briar Cliff Chargers football coaches
Carroll Pioneers football coaches
Illinois State Redbirds football coaches
Knox Prairie Fire football coaches
Knox Prairie Fire football players
Southern Illinois Salukis football coaches
Wisconsin–Oshkosh Titans football coaches
Illinois State University alumni